The Stele of Zakkur (or Zakir) is a royal stele of King Zakkur of Hamath and Luhuti (or Lu'aš) in the province Nuhašše of Syria, who ruled around 785 BC.

Description 
The inscription was on the lower part of the original stele. The upper part is now missing; it probably had the statue of king Zakkur sitting on a chair. Only some small parts of the upper part are still preserved such as the feet.

Discovery 
The Stele was discovered in 1903 at Tell Afis (mentioned in the Stele as Hazrach), 45 km southeast of Aleppo, in the territory of the ancient kingdom of Hamath. It was published in 1907. The long inscription is known as KAI 202; it reads, in part:

I am Zakkur, king of Hamath and Luash . . . Bar-Hadad, son of Hazael, king of Aram, united against me seventeen kings . . .all these kings laid siege to Hazrach . . . Baalshamayn said to me, "Do not be afraid!  . . .I will save you from all [these kings who] have besieged you"

'Bar-Hadad' mentioned in the inscription may have been Bar-Hadad III, son of Hazael.

Deities 
Two gods are mentioned in the inscription, Baalshamin and Iluwer. Iluwer was the personal god of king Zakkur, while Baalshamin was the god of the city. It is believed that Iluwer represents the earlier god Mer or Wer going back to 3rd millennium BC.

This inscription represents the earliest Aramaean evidence of the god Baalshamin/Ba'alsamayin.

Phoenician Yehimilk inscription, also mentioning Baalshamin is even earlier. It dates to the 10th century BCE.

See also

Baal with Thunderbolt
List of artifacts significant to the Bible

Notes

Bibliography
 Pognon, H., Inscriptions sémitiques de la Syrie, de la Mésopotamie, et de la région de Mossoul. . Paris: Imprimerie nationale/Gabalda, 1907
 Driver, S.R., "An Aramaic Inscription from Syria." Expositor 7/5 (1908): 481–90.
 Ronzevalle, S., "An Aramaic inscription of Zakir, ruler of Hamath and Laˁš." Al-Mashriq 11 (1908): 302–10
 Halévy, J., "Inscription de Zakir, roi de Hamat, découverte par M. H. Pognon." RevSém 16 (1908a): 243–46
 Nöldeke, Theodor, "Aramäische Inschriften." ZA 21 (1908a): 375–88
 Montgomery, James A., "Some Gleanings from Pognon's ZKR Inscription." JBL 28 (1909): 57–70

External links
 The Aramaic Inscription of Zakar, King of Hamath 
 A picture  of the stele online.

9th-century BC steles
8th-century BC steles
1903 archaeological discoveries
Ancient Near East steles
Syro-Hittite states
Zakur
Syrian art
Archaeological discoveries in Syria
Near East and Middle East antiquities of the Louvre
Phoenician inscriptions
KAI inscriptions
Phoenician steles
Steles
Archaeological artifacts